Vatsun is a Kashmiri literary form derived from Sanskrit  meaning "word/speech". This is because it has no particular pattern of versification or rhyme scheme. The metres and rhyme schemes of vatsun are varied, but generally each unit is a stanza of three lines followed by a refrain. Vatsun bears a resemblance to Urdu lyric. Vatsun is also similar to the ghazals of the Middle East and iambic pentameter of the Western world.

In poetry, it is a popular age-old folk-form dating back to the 14th century, when Lal Ded and Sheikh-ul-Alam (alias Nund Rishi) wrote in the Kashmiri language the devotional poetry depicting their mystic experiences, love for God, love for others, and folk dancing.

Notable Vatsun poets 
 Lal Ded (1320–1387)
 Nund Rishi (1377–1438)
 Dina Nath Nadim (1916–1988)

See also 
ghazal
Iambic Pentameter

References 

Kashmiri literature